Palazzo dei Camerlenghi is a Renaissance palazzo in Venice, northern Italy, located in the sestiere (quarter) of San Polo.  It faces the Canal Grande, adjacent to the Rialto Bridge.

History

The palazzo was built in the fifteenth century and finished in 1488. From 1525 to 1528 it was enlarged according to a design by Guglielmo dei Grigi, who was inspired by the style of Mauro Codussi and Pietro Lombardo. Due to this function, the lower floor was used as a jail for those who defaulted on their debts: the location near the crowded Rialto Bridge served as an admonition for the people passing by.

The palazzo currently houses the regional main offices of the Italian Comptroller and Auditor General.

Description
The three-storey palazzo has a pentagonal floor plan which follows the shoreline of the Grand Canal. It has tall windows with centrings, divided by false columns and decorated with friezes.  There were once polychrome marble and porphyry slabs, now lost. The medallion on the facade once incorporated a painted St Mark's lion.

Due to the Venetian tradition that, when leaving their post, magistrates would leave a religiously themed painting and a portrait in their former office, the Palazzo dei Camerlenghi came to house numerous artworks. Sometimes these paintings expressed social-political notions of civic virtue.  These were removed during the French occupation; some eventually returned to Venice, mostly to the Gallerie dell'Accademia.

See also
Rialto Bridge
Canal Grande
Palazzo dei Dieci Savi

Sources

 Cottrell, Philip: Corporate Colors: Bonifacio and Tintoretto at the Palazzo Dei Camerlenghi in Venice
 Hamilton, Paul C. The Palazzo dei Camerlenghi in Venice. Journal of the Society of Architectural Historians 42 (1983) 258–271.
 Kölmel, Nicolai: The Queen in the Pawnshop: Shaping Civic Virtues in a Painting for the Palazzo dei Camerlenghi in Venice.In: Burghartz et al: Sites of Mediation. Connected Histories of Places, Processes, and Objects in Europe and Beyond, 1450–1650. Brill, Leiden 2016. doi: 10.1163/9789004325760_006

References

Buildings and structures completed in 1528
Houses completed in the 16th century
Camerlenghi
Camerlenghi
Renaissance architecture in Venice